Rama Shankar Singh (also known as Rama Shankar Singh Patel) born July 15, 1969 is an Indian politician and a member of 17th Legislative Assembly, Uttar Pradesh of India. He represents the Marihan constituency in Mirzapur district of Uttar Pradesh. He is a member of the Bharatiya Janata Party. In 2010 he was awarded for good work in his village (Idol Village) by the President of India  Dr. A P J Abdul Kalam.

Political career
Singh defeated his close contestant Lalitesh Pati Tripathi from Indian National Congress with a margin of 46,598 votes in the Uttar Pradesh Legislative Assembly election held in 2017.

He has been appointed Minister of state of Energy and Additional Energy Sources of Energy  in a Yogi Adityanath cabinet on 21 August 2019. Rama was also selected for Adarsh Gram under the Swachh Bharat Mission Grameen by the Government of Uttar Pradesh.

Posts held

References

Uttar Pradesh MLAs 2017–2022
Uttar Pradesh politicians
1969 births
Living people
Bharatiya Janata Party politicians from Uttar Pradesh
Uttar Pradesh MLAs 2022–2027